Kursaal may refer to:

Kursaal (amusement park), an amusement park in Southend-on-Sea, Essex, England
 Kursaal Ward, a council ward in Southend-on-Sea, Essex, England
 Dome Cinema, Worthing, previously named the Kursaal
 Royal Hall, Harrogate, previously named the Kursaal
 Villa Marina, Isle of Man, previously named the Kursaal
Kursaal Congress Centre and Auditorium, a convention centre in San Sebastián, Spain
Kursaal, in Interlaken, Switzerland
The Kursaal Flyers, an English pub rock band
Kursaal (novel), a novel by Peter Anghelides